Environmental Ethics is a peer-reviewed academic journal covering the study of philosophical aspects of environmental problems. It was established in 1979 by Eugene Hargrove and is published by the Center for Environmental Philosophy (University of North Texas). Production of the journal, subscriptions, and online access are managed by the Philosophy Documentation Center.

Abstracting and indexing 
Environmental Ethics is abstracted and indexed in:

 Abstracts in Environmental Management
 Academic Search Premier
 AgrIndex
 ATLA Religion Database
 Bibliography of Agriculture
 BIOSIS Previews
 Current Contents/Social & Behavioral Sciences
 Current Philosophy
 Dow Jones Insight
 Ecology Abstracts
 Energy Abstracts
 Environment Abstracts
 Environment Index
 Environmental Engineering Abstracts
 Environmental Periodicals Bibliography
 Environmental Science and Pollution Management
 ERIH PLUS
 Expanded Academic ASAP
 Factiva
 Humanities International Index
 International Bibliography of Book Reviews of Scholarly Literature
 International Bibliography of Periodical Literature
 International Philosophical Bibliography
 MEDLINE
 MLA International Bibliography
 Periodica Islamica
 Philosopher's Index
 PhilPapers
 Political Science Abstracts
 Pollution Abstracts
 ProQuest 5000
 Public Affairs Index
 Referativny Zhurnal
 Religious and Theological Abstracts
 Safety Science Abstracts
 Scopus
 SocINDEX
 Social Sciences Citation Index
 Sociological Abstracts
 Wildlife Review
 Wilson OmniFILE
 The Zoological Record

According to the Journal Citation Reports, the journal has a 2015 impact factor of 0.283, ranking it 46th out of 51 journals in the category "Ethics".

See also 
 Environmental philosophy
 List of ethics journals
 List of philosophy journals
 List of environmental journals

References

External links 
 

English-language journals
Environmental ethics journals
Environmental studies journals
Environmental humanities journals
Philosophy Documentation Center academic journals
Publications established in 1979
Quarterly journals